High-altitude adaptation in humans is an instance of evolutionary modification in certain human populations, including those of Tibet in Asia, the Andes of the Americas, and Ethiopia in Africa, who have acquired the ability to survive at altitudes above 2,500 meters (8,200 ft). This adaptation means irreversible, long-term physiological responses to high-altitude environments, associated with heritable behavioural and genetic changes. While the rest of the human population would suffer serious health consequences, the indigenous inhabitants of these regions thrive well in the highest parts of the world. These humans have undergone extensive physiological and genetic changes, particularly in the regulatory systems of oxygen respiration and blood circulation, when compared to the general lowland population.

Around 81.6 million humans (approximately 1.1% of the world's human population) live permanently at altitudes above 2,500 meters (8,200 sf), putting these populations at risk for chronic mountain sickness (CMS). However, the high-altitude populations in South America, East Africa, and South Asia have done so for millennia without apparent complications. This special adaptation is now recognised as an example of natural selection in action. The adaptation of the Tibetans is the fastest known example of human evolution, as it is estimated to have occurred any time around 1,000 BCE. to 7,000 BCE.

Origin and basis

Humans are naturally adapted to lowland environments where oxygen is abundant. When humans from the general lowlands go to altitudes above  they experience altitude sickness, which is a type of hypoxia, a clinical syndrome of severe lack of oxygen. Some humans get the illness even at above 1,500 meters (5,000 ft). Symptoms include fatigue, dizziness, breathlessness, headaches, insomnia, malaise, nausea, vomiting, body pain, loss of appetite, ear-ringing, blistering and purpling of the hands and feet, and dilated blood vessels.

The sickness is compounded by related symptoms such as cerebral oedema (swelling of brain)  and pulmonary oedema (fluid accumulation in lungs) . For several days, the affected will breathe excessively and burn extra energy,  even when the body is relaxed. The heart rate then gradually decreases. Hypoxia is one of the principal causes of death among mountaineers. In women, pregnancy can be severely affected, such as development of high blood pressure, called preeclampsia, which causes premature labor, low birth weight of babies, and often complicated with profuse bleeding, seizures, or death of the mother.

Certain natives of Tibet, Ethiopia, and the Andes have been living at these high altitudes for generations and are protected from hypoxia as a consequence of genetic adaptation. Highlanders are thus constantly exposed to a low oxygen environment, yet they live without any debilitating problems. One of the best documented effects of high altitude is a progressive reduction in birth weight. It has been known that women of the long-resident, high-altitude population are not affected. These women are known to give birth to heavier-weight infants than women of lowland inhabitants. This is particularly true among Tibetan babies, whose average birth weight is 294–650 (~470) g heavier than the surrounding Chinese population; and their blood-oxygen level is considerably higher.

The first scientific investigations of high-altitude adaptation was done by A. Roberto Frisancho of the University of Michigan in the late 1960s among the Quechua people of Peru. Paul T. Baker, Penn State University, (in the Department of Anthropology) also conducted a considerable amount of research into human adaptation to high altitudes, and mentored students who continued this research. One of these students, anthropologist Cynthia Beall of Case Western Reserve University, began to conduct research on high altitude adaptation among the Tibetans in the early 1980s, still doing so to this day.

Physiological basis

Tibetans

Scientists started to notice the extraordinary physical performance of Tibetans since the beginning of Himalayan climbing era in the early 20th century. The hypothesis of a possible evolutionary genetic adaptation makes sense. Fairly large numbers (approximately 600,000) live at an altitude exceeding  in the Chantong-Qingnan area. Where the Tibetan highlanders live, the oxygen level is only about 60% of that at sea level. The Tibetans, who have been living in this region for 3,000 years, do not exhibit the elevated hemoglobin concentrations to cope with oxygen deficiency as observed in other populations who have moved temporarily or permanently at high altitudes. Instead, the Tibetans inhale more air with each breath and breathe more rapidly than either sea-level populations or Andeans. Tibetans have better oxygenation at birth, enlarged lung volumes throughout life, and a higher capacity for exercise. They show a sustained increase in cerebral blood flow, lower hemoglobin concentration, and less susceptibility to chronic mountain sickness than other populations, due to their longer history of high-altitude habitation.

Individuals can develop short-term tolerance with careful physical preparation and systematic monitoring of movements, but the biological changes are quite temporary and reversible when they return to lowlands. Moreover, unlike lowland people who only experience increased breathing for a few days after entering high altitudes, Tibetans retain this rapid breathing and elevated lung-capacity throughout their lifetime. This enables them to inhale larger amounts of air per unit of time to compensate for low oxygen levels. In addition, they have high levels (mostly double) of nitric oxide in their blood, when compared to lowlanders, and this probably helps their blood vessels dilate for enhanced blood circulation. Further, their hemoglobin level is not significantly different (average 15.6 g/dl in males and 14.2 g/dl in females), from those of humans living at low altitude. (Normally, mountaineers experience >2 g/dl increase in Hb level at Mt. Everest base camp in two weeks.) In this way they are able to evade both the effects of hypoxia and mountain sickness throughout life. Even when they climbed the highest summits like Mt. Everest, they showed regular oxygen uptake, greater ventilation, brisker hypoxic ventilatory responses, larger lung volumes, greater diffusing capacities, constant body weight and a better quality of sleep, compared to lowland people.

Andeans

In contrast to the Tibetans who have been living at high altitudes for no more than 11,000 years, the Andean highlanders show different pattern of hemoglobin adaptation. Their hemoglobin concentration is higher compared to those of lowlander population, which also happens to lowlanders moving to high altitude. When they spend some weeks in the lowland their hemoglobin drops to average of other humans. This shows only temporary and reversible acclimatization. However, in contrast to lowland people, they do have increased oxygen level in their hemoglobin, that is, more oxygen per blood volume than other humans. This confers an ability to carry more oxygen in each red blood cell, making a more effective transport of oxygen in their body, while their breathing is essentially at the same rate. This enables them to overcome hypoxia and normally reproduce without risk of death for the mother or baby. The Andean highlanders are known from the 16th-century missionaries that their reproduction had always been normal, without any effect in the giving birth or the risk for early pregnancy loss, which are common to hypoxic stress. They have developmentally acquired enlarged residual lung volume and its associated increase in alveolar area, which are supplemented with increased tissue thickness and moderate increase in red blood cells. Though the physical growth in body size is delayed, growth in lung volumes is accelerated. An incomplete adaptation such as elevated hemoglobin levels still leaves them at risk for mountain sickness with old age. 

Among the Quechua people of the Altiplano, there is a significant variation in NOS3 (the gene encoding endothelial nitric oxide synthase, eNOS), which is associated with higher levels of nitric oxide in high altitude. Nuñoa children of Quechua ancestry exhibit higher blood-oxygen content (91.3) and lower heart rate (84.8) than their counterpart school children of different ethnicity, who have an average of 89.9 blood-oxygen and 88–91 heart rate. High-altitude born and bred females of Quechua origins have comparatively enlarged lung volume for increased respiration. 

Blood profile comparisons show that among the Andeans, Aymaran highlanders are better adapted to highlands than the Quechuas. Among the Bolivian Aymara people, the resting ventilation and hypoxic ventilatory response were quite low (roughly 1.5 times lower), in contrast to those of the Tibetans. The intrapopulation genetic variation was relatively less among the Aymara people. Moreover, when compared to Tibetans, the blood hemoglobin level at high altitudes among Aymaran is notably higher, with an average of 19.2 g/dl for males and 17.8 g/dl for females. Among the different native highlander populations, the underlying physiological responses to adaptation are quite different. For example, among four quantitative features, such as are resting ventilation, hypoxic ventilatory response, oxygen saturation, and hemoglobin concentration, the levels of variations are significantly different between the Tibetans and the Aymaras. Methylation also influences oxygenation.

Ethiopians

Highland Ethiopians exhibit elevated hemoglobin levels, like Andeans and lowlander humans at high altitudes, but do not exhibit the Andeans’ increase in oxygen content of hemoglobin. Among healthy individuals, the average hemoglobin concentrations are 15.9 and 15.0 g/dl for males and females, respectively (which is lower than normal, almost similar to the Tibetans), and an average oxygen saturation of hemoglobin is 95.3% (which is higher than average, like the Andeans). Additionally, Ethiopian highlanders do not exhibit any significant change in blood circulation of the brain, which has been observed among the Peruvian highlanders (and attributed to their frequent altitude-related illnesses). Yet, similar to the Andeans and Tibetans, the Ethiopian highlanders are immune to the extreme dangers posed by high-altitude environment, and their pattern of adaptation is definitely unique from that of other highland people.

Genetic basis

The underlying molecular evolution of high-altitude adaptation has been explored and understood fairly recently. Depending on the geographical and environmental pressures, high-altitude adaptation involves different genetic patterns, some of which have evolved quite recently. For example, Tibetan adaptations became prevalent in the past 3,000 years, a rapid example of recent human evolution. At the turn of the 21st century, it was reported that the genetic make-up of the respiratory components of the Tibetan and the Ethiopian populations are significantly different.

Tibetans 

Substantial evidence in Tibetan highlanders suggests that variation in hemoglobin and blood-oxygen levels are adaptive as Darwinian fitness. It has been documented that Tibetan women with a high likelihood of possessing one to two alleles for high blood-oxygen content (which is rare in other women) had more surviving children, the higher the oxygen capacity, the lower the infant mortality. In 2010, for the first time, the genes responsible for the unique adaptive traits were identified following genome sequencing of 50 Tibetans and 40 Han Chinese from Beijing. Initially, the strongest signal of natural selection detected was a transcription factor involved in response to hypoxia, called endothelial Per-Arnt-Sim (PAS) domain protein 1 (EPAS1). It was found that one single-nucleotide polymorphism (SNP) at EPAS1 shows a 78% frequency difference between Tibetan and mainland Chinese samples, representing the fastest genetic change observed in any human gene to date. Hence, Tibetan adaptation to high altitude becomes the fastest process of phenotypically observable evolution in humans, which is estimated to have occurred a few thousand years ago, when the Tibetans split up from the mainland Chinese population. The time of genetic divergence has been variously estimated as 2,750 (original estimate), 4,725, 8,000, or 9,000 years ago. Mutations in EPAS1, at higher frequency in Tibetans than their Han neighbours, correlate with decreased hemoglobin concentrations among the Tibetans, which is the hallmark of their adaptation to hypoxia. Simultaneously, two genes, egl nine homolog 1 (EGLN1) (which inhibits hemoglobin production under high oxygen concentration) and peroxisome proliferator-activated receptor alpha (PPARA), were also identified to be positively selected in relation to decreased hemoglobin nature in the Tibetans.

Similarly, the Sherpas, known for their Himalayan hardiness, exhibit similar patterns in the EPAS1 gene, which further fortifies that the gene is under selection for adaptation to the high-altitude life of Tibetans. A study in 2014 indicates that the mutant EPAS1 gene could have been inherited from archaic hominins, the Denisovans. EPAS1 and EGLN1 are definitely the major genes for unique adaptive traits when compared with those of the Chinese and Japanese. Comparative genome analysis in 2014 revealed that the Tibetans inherited an equal mixture of genomes from the Nepalese-Sherpas and Hans, and they acquired the adaptive genes from the sherpa-lineage. Further, the population split was estimated to occur around 20,000 to 40,000 years ago, a range of which support archaeological, mitochondria DNA and Y chromosome evidence for an initial colonisation of the Tibetan plateau around 30,000 years ago.

The genes (EPAS1, EGLN1, and PPARA) function in concert with another gene named hypoxia inducible factors (HIF), which in turn is a principal regulator of red blood cell production (erythropoiesis) in response to oxygen metabolism. The genes are associated not only with decreased hemoglobin levels, but also in regulating energy metabolism. EPAS1 is significantly associated with increased lactate concentration (the product of anaerobic glycolysis), and PPARA is correlated with decrease in the activity of fatty acid oxidation. EGLN1 codes for an enzyme, prolyl hydroxylase 2 (PHD2), involved in erythropoiesis. Among the Tibetans, mutation in EGLN1 (specifically at position 12, where cytosine is replaced with guanine; and at 380, where G is replaced with C) results in mutant PHD2 (aspartic acid at position 4 becomes glutamine, and cysteine at 127 becomes serine) and this mutation inhibits erythropoiesis. The mutation is estimated to occur about 8,000 years ago. Further, the Tibetans are enriched for genes in the disease class of human reproduction (such as genes from the DAZ, BPY2, CDY, and HLA-DQ and HLA-DR gene clusters) and biological process categories of response to DNA damage stimulus and DNA repair (such as RAD51, RAD52, and MRE11A), which are related to the adaptive traits of high infant birth weight and darker skin tone and are most likely due to recent local adaptation.

Andeans

The patterns of genetic adaptation among the Andeans are largely distinct from those of the Tibetan, with both populations showing evidence of positive natural selection in different genes or gene regions. For genes in the HIF pathway, EGLN1 is the only instance where evidence of positive selection is observed in both Tibetans and Andeans. Even then, the pattern of variation for this gene differs between the two populations. Furthermore, there are no significant associations between EPAS1 or EGLN1 SNP genotypes and hemoglobin concentration among the Andeans, which has been the characteristic of the Tibetans. The Andean pattern of adaptation is characterized by selection in a number of genes involved in cardiovascular development and function (such as BRINP3, EDNRA, NOS2A). This suggests that selection in Andeans, instead of targeting the HIF pathway like in the Tibetans, focused on adaptations of the cardiovascular system to combat chronic disease at high altitude. Analysis of ancient Andean genomes, some dating back 7000 years, discovered selection in DST, a gene involved in cardiovascular function. The whole genome sequences of 20 Andeans (half of them having chronic mountain sickness) revealed that two genes, SENP1 (an erythropoiesis regulator) and ANP32D (an oncogene) play vital roles in their weak adaptation to hypoxia.

Ethiopians

The adaptive mechanism of Ethiopian highlanders is quite different. Genomic analysis of two ethnic groups, Amhara and Oromo, revealed that gene variations associated with hemoglobin difference among Tibetans or other variants at the same gene location do not influence the adaptation in Ethiopians. Identification of specific genes further reveals that several candidate genes are involved in Ethiopians, including CBARA1, VAV3, ARNT2 and THRB. Two of these genes (THRB and ARNT2) are known to play a role in the HIF-1 pathway, a pathway implicated in previous work reported in Tibetan and Andean studies. This supports the concept that adaptation to high altitude arose independently among different highlanders as a result of convergent evolution.

See also 

 Altitude
 Effects of high altitude on humans (including acclimatisation)
 High-altitude adaptation
 High-altitude football controversy
 Tibetan Plateau

References

External links 

Adapting to High Altitude 
High Altitude and Cold: Adaptation to the extremes 
Understanding adaptation to high altitude in the Andean region 
BBC: Altitude tolerant
Understanding Evolution: The mysteries of Tibet
Scientific resources at the Center for Research on Tibet 
Evolutionary Adaptations in High Altitude Tibet 
The Challenge of Living at High Altitudes
Adapting to High Altitude 

Mountaineering and health
Respiratory physiology
Human evolution
Anthropology
Evolutionary biology